Dilshod Rakhmatullaev (born 17 February 1989) is an Uzbek professional footballer who plays as a midfielder for FC Nasaf.

Career
He started playing career at Lokomotiv Tashkent in 2010. In January 2014 he moved on loan to Şanlıurfaspor. In July 2014 he left Şanlıurfaspor. Rakhmatullaev rejoined Lokomotiv at end of July 2014 and played until end of 2015 season. He left Lokomotiv and joined Nasaf Qarshi for 2016 season.

International
Rakhmatullaev made official debut for national team on 29 January 2012 in friendly match against UAE.

Honours
Lokomotiv
Uzbek League runner-up (3): 2013, 2014, 2015
Uzbek Cup (1): 2014
Uzbekistan Super Cup (1): 2015

Nasaf
Uzbekistan Super Cup (1): 2016

References

External links

1989 births
Living people
Uzbekistani footballers
PFC Lokomotiv Tashkent players
FC AGMK players
Şanlıurfaspor footballers
FC Nasaf players
Pakhtakor Tashkent FK players
Association football midfielders
Uzbekistan Super League players
FK Andijon players
Uzbekistan international footballers